Par14 (eukaryotic homolog of parvulin, EHPF) is a member of the parvulin family of peptidyl-prolyl-cis/trans-isomerases (PPIases) in humans, which possesses prolyl isomerase activity.

History
In 1999, Par14 was identified by two groups independently. After the discovery of human Pin1 in 1996, Par14 turned out to be the second member of the human parvulin family. In contrast to Pin1, Par14 exhibits minor catalytic activity, shows no preference for phosphorylated substrates and fails to rescue the loss of the Pin1-related parvulin Ess1 in yeast. Par14 orthologs are found in many unicellular eukaryotes and all multicellular organisms. In 2006, a Par14 isoform, denoted Par17, was described, which carries an N-terminal extension of 25 residues and is exclusively expressed in hominids.

Expression and localization
Par14 originates from transcription of the PIN4 gene on chromosome Xq13.1. The promotor region is TATA-less and located within a CpG island. The protein is primarily active within the nucleus/nucleolus of the cell, but also found within the cytoplasm.

Biological function 
Cytoplasm:
Par14 interacts with the insulin receptor substrate (IRS-1) and enhances insulin-induced tyrosine-phosphorylation of IRS-1. During mitosis Par14 associates to the spindle apparatus. In vitro experiments demonstrated that Par14 may be involved in filament polymerization.

Nucleus/Nucleolus:
Phosphorylation of Ser19 by casein kinase 2 translocates Par14 into the cellular nucleus. After dephosphorylation the protein associates to chromatin, with the N-terminus mainly responsible for high-affinity DNA binding. Par14 is found in pre-ribosomal ribonuclear protein complexes, where it acts as an rRNA processing factor. Photoaffinity labeling and Liquid chromatography–mass spectrometry analysis reveal the enzyme to be associated with proteins functioning in DNA replication, DNA repair and/or chromatin remodeling. Par14 requires phosphorylation of Ser7 and Ser9 by protein kinase B (Akt) (or protein kinase C) for nuclear export. This export is probably maintained by 14-3-3 protein in a Crm1 dependent way.

Structure
Par14’s catalytic domain exhibits the typical parvulin fold (order of secondary structure elements β1-α1-α2-h-β2-α3-β3-β4; α = α-helix, β = β-strand, h = helical turn) found in all members of this family, so far.  Its three-dimensional structure PDB-ID: 3UI4  PDB-ID: 1EQ3 is characterized by a ‘gripping hand’ topology with the central β-sheet core (consisting of four antiparallel strands) opposing α-helix 3. The catalytic center resides on the concave side of the β-sheet. An N-terminal IDR-like stretch composed of mainly small or basic residues precedes this domain. The IDR element is prone to post-translational modifications.

Disease related function/clinical aspects 
Par14 is involved in the upregulation of hepatitis B virus replication. Expression of Par14 correlates to primary biliary cirrhosis, an autoimmune chronic cholestatic liver disease. K-RAS exosomes of collateral cancer cells were found to carry Par14.

References

EC 5.2.1